Buchanania splendens is a tree in the family Anacardiaceae. The specific epithet  is from the Latin meaning "shining", referring to the leaves.

Description
Its smooth bark is grey-brown. The flowers are white.

Distribution and habitat
Buchanania splendens grows naturally in the Andaman and Nicobar Islands, Sumatra and Borneo. Its habitat is lowland forests.

References

splendens
Flora of the Andaman Islands
Flora of the Nicobar Islands
Trees of Sumatra
Trees of Borneo
Plants described in 1861
Taxa named by Friedrich Anton Wilhelm Miquel